27th Garrison Division({zh|守备第27师}) was formed in summer 1964 in Tunchang, Hainan. The division acted as a mobile defense force of northern Hainan island.

In 1970 the division was reorganized and renamed as 131st Army Division({zh|陆军第131师}). The division was then composed of:
391st Infantry Regiment;
392nd Infantry Regiment;
393rd Infantry Regiment;
Artillery Regiment.

In December 1979, 391st Infantry Regiment was detached and converted to 1st Marine Brigade.

From July 1982 to March 1983, 392nd Infantry Regiment was deployed to Guangxi to take part in the Sino-Vietnam War. During its deployment the regiment inflicted about 50 casualties to confronting PAVN units.

In 1985 the division was disbanded. All remnants were absorbed into 132nd Infantry Division.

References

建国后中国人民解放军步兵师的发展 (2011年版), http://club.xilu.com/zgjsyj/msgview-819697-74513.html
中国人民解放军各步兵师沿革, http://blog.sina.com.cn/s/blog_a3f74a990101cp1q.html

Infantry divisions of the People's Liberation Army
Military units and formations established in 1964
Military units and formations disestablished in 1985